Mulsoo is a village located in Anantnag Tehsil of Anantnag district in Jammu and Kashmir, India.A village which consists of around seven+ ponds of fresh water which are usually moderate hot in winters and cold in summers.

References

External links

Villages in Anantnag district